Ospedaletto Lodigiano is a comune (municipality) in the province of Lodi in the Italian region of Lombardy, located about  southeast of Milan and about  southeast of Lodi.

Ospedaletto Lodigiano borders the following municipalities: Brembio, Casalpusterlengo, Livraga, Somaglia, Orio Litta, Senna Lodigiana.

See also
Ad Rotas

References 

Cities and towns in Lombardy